Old Man Emu is the debut extended play by Australian country music artist John Williamson. It was released in January 1973.

Background and release
In 1970, Williamson entered New Faces, an Australian talent show, with the self-penned track "Old Man Emu". Williamson won the contest and signed with the newly formed label Fable Records. "Old Man Emu" was released in May 1970 which peaked at number 4 on the Kent Music Report and was certified gold in Australia. Williamson released his debut studio album in 1970 but failed to chart. He released four non-charting solo singles between 1970 and 1972.

Track listing

Release history

References

1973 debut EPs
John Williamson (singer) albums
Indie pop EPs
EPs by Australian artists